Dunia Anita is a Malaysian sitcom drama, broadcast every Wednesday at 10:00 pm on TV3. This sitcom is a spin-off of comedy drama Puteri, directed by Aziz M. Osman, and stars Siti Fazurina and Zul Yahya.

References 

Malaysian drama television series